Magda is a municipality in the state of São Paulo in Brazil. The population is 3,102 (2020 est.) in an area of 312 km². The elevation is 526 m.

References

Municipalities in São Paulo (state)